Simona is a 2018 Argentine telenovela produced by Pol-ka and broadcast by El Trece from January 22 to August 31, 2018.

Cast 
 Ángela Torres as Simona Sánchez/Mendoza
 Gastón Soffritti as Romeo Guerrico
 Juan Darthés as Diego Guerrico
 Ana María Orozco as Marilina Mendoza
 Romina Gaetani as Sienna Velasco
Agustín Casanova as Dante Guerrico
 Renato Quattordio as Lucas "Junior" Guerrico
 Gabriel Gallicchio as Blas  Quevedo Linares
 Darío Barassi as Pablo "Paul" Medina
 Mercedes Scápola as Ángeles "Angie" Buero
 María Rosa Fugazot as Rosa
 Thais Rippel as Chipi
 Minerva Casero as Ailín Medina
 Federico Olivera as Santiago Solano
 Fausto Bengoechea as Piru
 Vanesa Butera as Lucrecia Juárez
 Agustina Cabo as Agustina Becker
 Florencia Vigna as Trinidad "Trini" Beruti
 Patricia Echegoyen as Javiera Fornide
 Marcelo Mazzarello as Juan Alberto  "Johnny" Lambaré
 Andrés Gil as Leonardo "Leo" 
 Stefanía Roitman as Lucila "Lula" Achával
 Yayo Guridi as Oscar Torreta
 Christian Inglize as Alan

References

External links 
  
 

2018 telenovelas
Argentine telenovelas
Pol-ka telenovelas
2018 Argentine television series debuts
2018 Argentine television series endings
Spanish-language telenovelas
Musical telenovelas
Comedy telenovelas